Brissopsis similis is a species of sea urchins of the family Brissidae. Their armour is covered with spines. Brissopsis similis was first scientifically described in 1948 by Ole Theodor Jensen Mortensen.

References 

Animals described in 1948
simils
Taxa named by Ole Theodor Jensen Mortensen